The Jackie Chan Stunt Team, also known as Jackie Chan's Stuntmen Association, is a group of stuntmen and martial artists who work alongside Jackie Chan. Founded in the 1970s, it initially included Hong Kong action stuntmen and martial artists, before expanding to include international talent over the next several decades.

History
The JC Stunt Team was established in 1976 and originated from the relationships Chan formed in his early starring roles in Hong Kong action movies. Several of his co-stars and stuntmen hired by the film studios began working together regularly. This engendered a familiarity of one another's skills and abilities and it made sense for them to become a working team. Some of the members had received training at the Peking Opera schools, similar to Chan.

By 1983, and the release of the film Project A, the stunt team had become an official organisation of six members. The organisation meant that the stuntmen not only received insurance coverage, but also a monthly salary and higher pay.
By the time of Police Story 2 in 1988, the team had expanded to around twenty members.
This incarnation of the team was disbanded in 1990 and thereafter, individual members were contracted and used on a film-by-film basis rather than all members remaining on the payroll. This allowed for some new faces, and the return of former members.

The formation of Chan's team influenced others in the business to follow suit, particularly his former co-stars and "brothers" Sammo Hung and Yuen Biao (their stunt teams known as "Hung Ga Ban" and "Yuen Ga Ban" respectively). Other actors who formed their own stunt teams include Lau Kar-leung, Philip Ko, Stanley Tong and Bruce Law.
Chan's stunt team worked in collaboration with Sammo Hung's team on films like Dragons Forever, Thunderbolt and Around the World in 80 Days.
A small number of films that Chan produced but did not appear in, or was not involved in at all, have utilised his stunt team. These include The Gold Hunters (1981), Rouge (1988), The Inspector Wears Skirts 2 (1989), Stage Door Johnny (1990) and Angry Ranger (1991).

Members (past & present)
These are former and current members of Chan's stunt team. Where possible, the films they have worked on are included.

 Wong Yiu - co-founder of the team in 1977 - The Fearless Hyena, Dragon Fist, Dance of Death, Spiritual Kung Fu, Half a Loaf of Kung Fu
 Peng Kang - co-founder of the team in 1977 - Spiritual Kung Fu, Half a Loaf of Kung Fu, The Fearless Hyena, Dragon Fist, The Fearless Hyena Part II
 Brad Allan (Bradley James Allan) – First ever non-Asian member of the team - Mr. Nice Guy, Who Am I?, Jackie Chan: My Stunts, Gorgeous, Shanghai Noon, The Accidental Spy, Rush Hour 2, The Tuxedo, Shanghai Knights, The Medallion, New Police Story, Rush Hour 3, Armour Of God 3: Chinese Zodiac, Shang-Chi and the Legend of the Ten Rings.
 Paul Andreovski – Mr. Nice Guy, Who Am I?, Shanghai Noon, The Accidental Spy, Rush Hour 2, The Tuxedo, Shanghai Knights,  The Medallion, Around the World in 80 Days, The Spy Next Door. Chan's personal boxing coach.
Lee Huang  (Konstantin Widjaja) - Bleeding Steel, Project X (SNAFU), Kung Fu Yoga
 Andy Owen (Andrew Owen) – Rush Hour 3
 Andy Long (Andreas Nguyen) – Armour Of God 3: Chinese Zodiac, Police Story 2013, Dragon Blade
Vi-Dan Tran  – The Foreigner, Bleeding Steel
 Yamson Domingo – Police Story, Thunderbolt
 Anthony Carpio (Go Shut-Fung) – Armour of God, Project A Part II, Police Story 2 Miracles, Twin Dragons, Drunken Master II, Thunderbolt, Jackie Chan: My Stunts, The Accidental Spy, The Medallion, New Police Story, Rob-B-Hood
 Chris Chan (Chan Sai-Tang) – Project A Part II, Police Story 2,  Miracles, Twin Dragons, City Hunter, Crime Story, The Accidental Spy
 Chan Siu-wah - Thunderbolt, The Accidental Spy
 Chan Man-ching – Dragons Forever, Police Story 3: Supercop, Drunken Master II, Rumble in the Bronx, Thunderbolt, Police Story 4: First Strike, Mr. Nice Guy, Rush Hour, Who Am I?, Jackie Chan: My Stunts, Gorgeous, The Accidental Spy, Rob-B-Hood
 Chan Tat-kwong (Chan Daat-Gong) – Project A, Police Story, Armour of God, Project A Part II, Police Story 2, Dragons Forever, Miracles, Twin Dragons, Crime Story, Drunken Master II, Thunderbolt, The Medallion, New Police Story, Rob-B-Hood
 Chan Wai-to - Police Story 4: First Strike
 Andy Cheng (Cheng Kai-Chung) – Mr. Nice Guy, Who Am I?, Jackie Chan: My Stunts, Rush Hour, Shanghai Noon, Rush Hour 2, The Tuxedo
 Johnny Cheung (Cheung Yiu-Wah) – Dragon Lord, Project A, The Protector, Police Story, Armour of God, Project A Part II, Dragons Forever, Police Story 2, Miracles, Twin Dragons, Crime Story, Drunken Master II, Rush Hour, Who Am I?, Jackie Chan: My Stunts, Around the World in 80 Days, Rob-B-Hood
 Danny Chow (Chow Yun-kin) – Dragon Lord, Police Story, Project A Part II, Dragons Forever, Miracles
 Joe Eigo – The Medallion, Around the World in 80 Days
 Fung Hak-on (Fung Hark-On) – Snake in the Eagle's Shadow, The Young Master, Winners and Sinners, Heart of Dragon, The Protector, Police Story, Dragons Forever, Miracles, Twin Dragons
 Hon Chun – Project A Part II, Thunderbolt, Rob-B-Hood
 Dani Hu (Fok Chan Keung) – The Protector, Police Story
 Louis Keung (Mak Wai-Cheung) – Heart of the Dragon, Miracles, Police Story 3: Supercop, Thunderbolt, Jackie Chan: My Stunts, Gorgeous, The Medallion
 Benny Lai (Lai Keung-Kuen) – The Young Master, Dragon Lord, Project A, Wheels on Meals, Police Story, Armour of God, Project A Part II, Police Story 2, Dragons Forever, Miracles, Operation Condor, Twin Dragons, Rumble in the Bronx, Thunderbolt, The Accidental Spy, Rush Hour 2
 Rocky Lai (Lai Keung-Kun) – Project A, Police Story, Armour of God, Project A Part II, Dragons Forever, Police Story 2, Miracles, Twin Dragons, Police Story 3: Supercop, Drunken Master II, Thunderbolt, Rumble in the Bronx, Police Story 4: First Strike, Mr. Nice Guy, Who Am I?, Jackie Chan: My Stunts, Gorgeous, The Accidental Spy, The Medallion, Rob-B-Hood
 Sam Wong (Lai Sing-kwong / Wong Ming-Sing) – Project A, Police Story, Armour of God, Project A Part II, Police Story 2, Miracles, Police Story 3: Supercop, City Hunter, Crime Story, Drunken Master II, Thunderbolt, Rumble in the Bronx, Who Am I?, Rush Hour, Jackie Chan: My Stunts, Gorgeous, The Accidental Spy. Stunt Team Leader.
 Ben Lam (Lam Kwok-Bun) – Heart of Dragon, Police Story, Project A Part II, Police Story 2
 Chris Li (Lee Kin Sang) – Project A, Police Story, Project A Part II, Police Story 2, Miracles, Twin Dragons, Drunken Master II
 Lee Chun-kit – Project A Part II, Police Story 2, Miracles, Around the World in 80 Days
 Nicky Li (Li Chung-Chi) – Project A, Armour of God, Project A Part II, Dragons Forever, Miracles, Twin Dragons, Crime Story, Drunken Master II, Thunderbolt, Rumble in the Bronx, Mr. Nice Guy, Rush Hour, Who Am I?, Shanghai Noon, Rush Hour 2, The Tuxedo, Shanghai Knights, The Medallion, Around the World in 80 Days, New Police Story, Rob-B-Hood. Stunt Team Leader.
 Ken Lo (Lo Wai-Kwong) – Project A Part II, Police Story 2, Miracles, Operation Condor, City Hunter, Police Story 3: Supercop, Crime Story, Drunken Master II, Thunderbolt, Police Story 4: First Strike, Who Am I?, Rush Hour, Jackie Chan: My Stunts, Gorgeous, Rush Hour 2, Shanghai Knights, Around the World in 80 Days, New Police Story, The Myth, Rob-B-Hood, Armour Of God 3: Chinese Zodiac. Also known for working as Chan's personal bodyguard.
 Mars (Chiang Wing-fat / Feng Sing) – The Young Master, Dragon Lord, Winners and Sinners, Project A, Wheels on Meals, The Protector, Police Story, Armour of God, Project A Part II, Dragons Forever, Police Story 2, Miracles, Operation Condor, Police Story 3: Supercop, Twin Dragons, Crime Story, Drunken Master II, Thunderbolt, Police Story 4: First Strike, Rumble in the Bronx, Mr. Nice Guy, Rush Hour, Gorgeous, Jackie Chan: My Stunts, Rush Hour 2, Shanghai Knights, Around the World in 80 Days, New Police Story. Chan's best stunt double.
 Max Huang (Huang You Liang) – Armour Of God 3: Chinese Zodiac, Police Story 2013
 Jack Wong (Wong Wai-Leung) – Jackie Chan: My Stunts, The Accidental Spy, Around the World in 80 Days, New Police Story, Rob-B-Hood
 Pang Hiu-sang – Police Story
 Frankie Poon (Poon Bin-chung) – Project A, Project A Part II
 William Tuen (Tuan Wai-Lun) – City Hunter, Police Story 3: Supercop, Crime Story, Drunken Master II, Thunderbolt, Rush Hour, Gorgeous, Rush Hour 2
 Wan Faat – Snake in the Monkey's Shadow, Project A, The Protector, Police Story, Project A Part II, Dragons Forever, Police Story 2, Miracles, Operation Condor, Twin Dragons, Crime Story, Drunken Master II
 Paul Wong (Wong Kwan) – The Young Master, Dragon Lord, Winners and Sinners, The Protector, Police Story
 Jon Foo (Jonathan Patrick Foo) – The Myth
 Peng Zhang – Rush Hour 3
 Wong Wai Fai - Rush Hour 2
 He Jun (Hoh Gwan) – The Tuxedo, Shanghai Knights, The Medallion, Around The World In 80 Days, New Police Story, The Myth, Rob-B-Hood, The Spy Next Door, Armour Of God 3: Chinese Zodiac, Police Story 2013
 Gang Wu (Ng Kong) – Shanghai Noon, Rush Hour 2, The Tuxedo, Shanghai Knights, The Medallion, Around the World in 80 Days, New Police Story, The Myth, Rob-B-Hood, Rush Hour 3, The Spy Next Door, The Karate Kid, Armour Of God 3: Chinese Zodiac
 Park Hyun Jin – Rush Hour 2, The Tuxedo, Shanghai Knights, The Medallion, Around the World in 80 Days, New Police Story, The Myth, Rob-B-Hood, Rush Hour 3, The Spy Next Door
 Lee In Seob – The Tuxedo, Shanghai Knights, The Medallion, Around the World in 80 Days, New Police Story, The Myth, Rob-B-Hood, Rush Hour 3, Armour Of God 3: Chinese Zodiac
 Han Kwan Hua (Han Guan Hua) – Shanghai Knights, The Medallion, New Police Story, Around the World in 80 Days, The Myth, Rob-B-Hood, Rush Hour 3, The Spy Next Door, Armour Of God 3: Chinese Zodiac
 Temur Mamisashvili - Skiptrace, Kung Fu Yoga, Bleeding Steel
 Allen Sit - Police Story 3: Supercop, Police Story 4: First Strike, Rumble in the Bronx, Thunderbolt
 Ho Sung-pak - Drunken Master II
 Kenya Sawada - Thunderbolt
 Chu Tau - Thunderbolt, The Medallion
 Tang Chiu-yau - Police Story 4: First Strike, The Accidental Spy
 Kwan Yung - Who Am I?, Rush Hour, The Accidental Spy
 Tom Wu - Shanghai Knights
 Russ Price – Who Am I?

Awards and nominations
 2001 Taurus World Stunt Awards
 Nominated: Shanghai Noon
 2002 Taurus World Stunt Awards
 Won: Rush Hour 2
 2004 Taurus World Stunt Awards
 Nominated: Shanghai Knights
 2008 Taurus World Stunt Awards
 Nominated: Rush Hour 3

References

 Some additional information and member list taken from

External links

 Jackie Chan Video
 

Hong Kong actors
Hong Kong stunt performers
Theatrical combat
Jackie Chan